Khanozai (خانوزئی) is a union council in Tehsil Karezat, Karezat District.

References

Populated places in Pishin District